Suzanne J. Hand (born 1955) is an associate professor at the University of New South Wales, a teacher of geology and biology, who has a special interest in vertebrate palaeontology and modern mammals. Her research has been published in over a hundred articles, and is especially focused on the subjects of evolutionary biology, functional morphology, phylogenetics, and biogeography. Hand is a co-leader of the research team investigating the Riversleigh World Heritage Area, regarded as one of the four most important sites of fossil-bearing formations in the world.

Amongst the recognition of Hand's contributions is the specific epithet of a fossil species of bird, Eoanseranas handae, discovered in the Riversleigh fossil sites.

References 

Australian paleontologists
Living people
Women paleontologists
Academic staff of the University of New South Wales
21st-century Australian scientists
21st-century Australian women scientists
1955 births